Reuben Thomas Henry Holland (27 June 1890 – 22 September 1944) was an Australian rules footballer who played with South Melbourne and Carlton in the Victorian Football League (VFL).

Notes

External links 

Reuben Holland's profile at Blueseum

Australian rules footballers from Melbourne
Sydney Swans players
Carlton Football Club players
Camberwell Football Club players
1890 births
1944 deaths
People from Richmond, Victoria